HD 31093, also known as HR 1559, is a visual binary located in the southern constellation Caelum, the chisel. The components have a combined apparent magnitude of 5.83, making it faintly visible to the naked eye. Based on parallax measurements from the Hipparcos spacecraft, the system is estimated to be 268 light years distant.

The components have stellar classifications of A1 and A4 V, indicating that both of them are A-type main-sequence stars. Since the components have a separation of  arcseconds, it is difficult to distinguish individually through a telescope. They take 43 years to circle each other in an eccentric orbit.

References

External links
 HR 1559
 CCDM J04515-3454
 Image HD 31093

Caelum
031093
Binary stars
022573
A-type main-sequence stars
1559
Durchmusterung objects